William B. Pratt (February 3, 1935 – December 25, 2019) was an American physician and politician who served as a member of the New Mexico House of Representatives from 2018 until his death in 2019.

Early life and education 
Pratt was born in Camden, New Jersey. He received his bachelor's degree from Wesleyan University in 1957 and his medical degree from Jefferson Medical College in 1961.

Career 
Pratt practiced medicine in West Reading, Pennsylvania and in Albuquerque, New Mexico; he was an orthopedic surgeon. Pratt served in the New Mexico House of Representatives in 2018 and 2019. He was a Democrat.

Notes

1935 births
2019 deaths
Politicians from Albuquerque, New Mexico
Politicians from Camden, New Jersey
Thomas Jefferson University alumni
Wesleyan University alumni
Physicians from Pennsylvania
Physicians from New Mexico
Democratic Party members of the New Mexico House of Representatives